Macroglossum belis, the common hummingbird hawkmoth, is a moth of the family Sphingidae. It was described by Carl Linnaeus in his 1758 10th edition of Systema Naturae. It is known from Sri Lanka, India, Nepal, Thailand, southern China, Taiwan, Japan (Ryukyu Archipelago), Vietnam and Indonesia (Java).

Description
The wingspan is 50–60 mm. Adults are attracted to the flowers of Duranta erecta and Lantana camara at dawn and dusk. The adult differs from Macroglossum affictitia in the head, thorax, abdomen and forewings being redder brown, the two lines forming the antemedial band of the forewing not filled in with black. The postmedial lines not so parallel, the second line being nearer the first at the costa, the third at inner margin. The patch near the apex reddish brown with no dark streak below it. Hindwings with reddish-yellow band.

Larva is black. The head red, a white subdorsal line and the sides spotted and streaked with red and yellow. Larvae have been recorded feeding on Strychnos angustiflora in Hong Kong and on Strychnos nux-vomica, Saprosoma indicum and Spermadictyon suaveolans in India.

References

External links
 

Macroglossum
Moths described in 1758
Moths of Asia
Moths of Indonesia
Moths of Japan
Moths of Sri Lanka
Moths of Taiwan
Taxa named by Carl Linnaeus